Les Misérables is a 1952 American film adapted from the 1862 novel Les Misérables by Victor Hugo.  It was directed by Lewis Milestone, and featured Michael Rennie as Jean Valjean, Robert Newton as Javert, and Sylvia Sidney as Fantine.

Plot

Cast
 Michael Rennie as Jean Valjean
 Debra Paget as Cosette
 Patsy Weil as Cosette (age 7)
 Robert Newton as Javert
 Edmund Gwenn as Bishop Myriel
 Sylvia Sidney as Fantine
 Cameron Mitchell as Marius
 Elsa Lanchester as Madame Magloire
 June Hillman as Mother Superior
 Bobby Hyatt as Gavroche
 James Robertson Justice as Robert
 Joseph Wiseman as Genflou
 Rhys Williams as Brevet
 Florence Bates as Madame Bonnet
 Merry Anders as Cicely
 John Rogers as Bonnet
 Charles Keane as Corporal
 John Dierkes as Bosun
 Lewis Russell as Waiter

Production
Louis Jourdan was announced for the role of Marius.

Radio adaptation
Les Misérables was presented on Lux Radio Theatre December 22, 1952. The one-hour adaptation starred Ronald Colman, with Paget and Newton repeating their roles from the film.

See also
 Adaptations of Les Misérables

References

External links
 
 
 
 
 

1952 films
American romantic drama films
1950s historical films
American historical films
Films set in the 19th century
Films set in Paris
1950s English-language films
Films scored by Alex North
Films directed by Lewis Milestone
Films based on Les Misérables
American black-and-white films
1952 romantic drama films
20th Century Fox films
1950s American films